Capparis mirifica is a species of plant in the Capparaceae family. It is endemic to Panama.  It is threatened by habitat loss.

References

mirifica
Critically endangered plants
Endemic flora of Panama
Taxonomy articles created by Polbot